Stjepan Betlheim (22 July 1898 – 24 September 1970) was a Croatian psychiatrist and psychoanalyst.

Early life and education
Betlheim was born in Zagreb to a Jewish family. He studied medicine in Graz and Vienna, where he showed interest in psychoanalysis and attended lectures of Sigmund Freud. He graduated in 1922. Betlheim specialised in neuropsychiatry in Vienna, Berlin, Zürich, and Paris. During his specialisation, he published six articles in distinguished Austrian and German neurological or neuropsychiatric journals.

Career and later life
He worked at the Vienna neuropsychiatric clinic headed by Julius Wagner-Jauregg. After the first analysis with Paul Schilder, Betlheim completed his training with Sandor Rado. Betlheim's first analyses were supervised by Karen Horney and Helene Deutsch. He returned to Zagreb in 1928. During World War II, in 1941, the Independent State of Croatia authorities sent Betlheim, Stjepan Steiner and 80 other Jewish physicians to Bosnia to treat endemic syphilis. He later escaped and joined the  Yugoslav Partisans. After the war, in 1948, he became an assistant at the Neurologic-psychiatric Clinic of the School of Medicine, University of Zagreb, where he introduced the psychoanalytical dimension into the understanding of mental illness. He became a member of the International Psychoanalytical Association in 1952. Betlheim further developed the group therapy for sexual disorders. In 1953 Betlheim founded the ambulatory psychotherapeutic ward, the first in Croatia, at the neurologic-psychiatric Clinic of the School of Medicine, University of Zagreb and neuropsychiatric clinic at the University Hospital Centre Zagreb. Parallel to his therapeutic work, Betlheim was also a prolific scientist and teacher.

Personal life and death
Betlheim was married to Marie Luise (née Morgenroth) with whom he had a daughter named Ruth. Until his death Betlheim treated patients, taught and did scientific research. He was buried at the Mirogoj Cemetery.

Honors
In 1998 Croatian Post issued a stamp to honor him. A Bust of Prof. Dr. Stjepan Betlheim is placed in front of the University Hospital Centre Zagreb. His daughter wrote a book about the life of her father, which was issued and presented in 2006 at the Jewish community in Zagreb.

Works
 Psihijatrija, 1959
 Neuroze i njihovo lečenje, 1963
 O govornim omaškama u Korsakovljevoj psihozi, 1989
 Snovi u psihoterapiji, 1993
 Radovi, pisma, dokumenti : 1898–1970, 2006

References

Bibliography

 
 

1898 births
1970 deaths
Physicians from Zagreb
Burials at Mirogoj Cemetery
Croatian Jews
Austro-Hungarian Jews
Croatian Austro-Hungarians
Croatian psychiatrists
Jewish physicians
Yugoslav Partisans members
Croatian people of World War II
Yugoslav physicians